Alco is a ghost town in Angelina County, in the U.S. state of Texas. It is located within the Lufkin, Texas micropolitan area.

History
Alco started as a flag station around 1911 after the Angelina and Neches River Railroad built through the community. There was a sawmill and a few houses in the 1930s. The sawmill closed during World War II and Alco became a ghost town. Only a few scattered, abandoned houses remained in the 1990s.

Geography

Education
Alco had its school in the 1930s. Today, the ghost town is located within the Huntington Independent School District.

See also
List of ghost towns in Texas

References

Geography of Angelina County, Texas
Ghost towns in East Texas